Mark Robert Warner (born December 15, 1954) is an American businessman and politician serving as the senior United States senator from Virginia, a seat he has held since 2009. A member of the Democratic Party, Warner served as the 69th governor of Virginia from 2002 to 2006. He is vice chair of the Senate Democratic Caucus and chair of the Senate Intelligence Committee.

Warner is the honorary chairman of Forward Together PAC. Apart from politics, he is known for his involvement in telecommunications-related venture capital during the 1980s; he founded the firm Columbia Capital.

In 2006, Warner was widely expected to pursue the Democratic nomination in the 2008 U.S. presidential election, but he announced in October 2006 that he would not run, citing a desire not to disrupt his family life. Warner delivered the keynote address at the 2008 Democratic National Convention, and was considered to be a potential vice presidential candidate until he took himself out of consideration after winning the Democratic nomination for the U.S. Senate.

Running against his gubernatorial predecessor, Jim Gilmore, Warner won his first election to the Senate in 2008 with 65% of the vote. He was reelected in 2014, narrowly defeating Ed Gillespie, and in 2020 defeating Republican nominee Daniel Gade by twelve percentage points.

With a net worth of $214.1 million, Warner is the second wealthiest member of Congress.

Early life and education
Warner was born in Indianapolis, Indiana, the son of Marjorie (née Johnston) and Robert F. Warner. He has a younger sister, Lisa. He grew up in Illinois, and later in Vernon, Connecticut, where he graduated from Rockville High School, a public secondary school. He has credited his interest in politics to his eighth grade social studies teacher, Jim Tyler, who "inspired him to work for social and political change during the tumultuous year of 1968." He was class president for three years at Rockville High School and hosted a weekly pick-up basketball game at his house, "a tradition that continues today."

Warner graduated from George Washington University (GWU), earning his Bachelor of Arts in political science in 1977. He was inducted into Phi Beta Kappa and graduated as the valedictorian of his class with a 4.0 grade point average. Warner was the first in his family to graduate from college. GWU later initiated him into Omicron Delta Kappa, the National Leadership Honor Society, as an alumni member in 1995. While at GWU, he worked on Capitol Hill to pay for his tuition, riding his bike early mornings to the office of U.S. Senator Abraham Ribicoff (D-CT). His sophomore year, Warner took time off from school to serve as the youth coordinator on Ella Grasso's successful gubernatorial bid in Connecticut. Upon returning to Washington, Warner took a part-time job in the office of then-Representative Chris Dodd. He went on to serve as Dodd's senatorial campaign manager during his freshman year of law school. When his parents visited him at college, he got two tickets for them to tour the White House; when his father asked him why he didn't get a ticket for himself, he replied, "I'll see the White House when I'm president."

Warner then graduated from Harvard Law School with a Juris Doctor in 1980 and coached the law school's first intramural women's basketball team. Warner then took a job raising money for the Democratic Party based in Atlanta from 1980 to 1982. Warner has never practiced law.

Early career 
Warner attempted to found two unsuccessful businesses before becoming a general contractor for cellular businesses and investors. As founder and managing director of Columbia Capital, a venture capital firm, he helped found or was an early investor in a number of technology companies, including Nextel. He co-founded Capital Cellular Corporation, and built up an estimated net worth of more than $200 million. As of 2012, he was the wealthiest U.S. senator.

State activism
Warner involved himself in public efforts related to health care, transportation, telecommunications, information technology and education. He managed Douglas Wilder's successful 1989 gubernatorial campaign and served as chairman of the state Democratic Party from 1993 to 1995. Warner also served, in the early 1990s, on the Virginia Commonwealth Transportation Board and sat in on monthly committee meetings of the Rail and Public Transportation Division (headed by Robert G. Corder).

1996 U.S. Senate election

He unsuccessfully ran for the U.S. Senate in 1996 against incumbent Republican John Warner (no relation) in a "Warner versus Warner" election. Mark Warner performed strongly in the state's rural areas, making the contest much closer than many pundits expected. He lost to the incumbent, 52%-47%, losing most parts of the state including the north.

Governor of Virginia

Elections

2001 

In 2001 Warner campaigned for governor as a moderate Democrat after years of slowly building up a power base in rural Virginia, particularly Southwest Virginia. His opponents were Republican Mark Earley, the state's attorney general, and the Libertarian candidate William B. Redpath. Warner won with 52.16 percent of the votes, 96,943 votes ahead of the next opponent. Warner had a significant funding advantage, spending $20 million compared with Earley's $10 million.

Tenure
After he was elected in 2002, Warner drew upon a $900 million "rainy day fund" left by his predecessor, James S. Gilmore, III. Warner campaigned in favor of two regional sales tax increases (Northern Virginia and Hampton Roads) to fund transportation. Virginians rejected both regional referendums to raise the sales tax.

In 2004, Warner worked with Democratic and moderate Republican legislators and the business community to reform the tax code, lowering food and some income taxes while increasing the sales and cigarette taxes. His tax package effected a net tax increase of approximately $1.5 billion annually. Warner credited the additional revenues with saving the state's AAA bond rating, held at the time by only five other states, and allowing the single largest investment in K-12 education in Virginia history. Warner also entered into an agreement with Democrats and moderate Republicans in the Virginia Senate to cap state car tax reimbursements to local governments.

During his tenure as governor, Warner influenced the world of college athletics. "Warner used his power as Virginia's governor in 2003 to pressure the Atlantic Coast Conference into revoking an invitation it had already extended to Syracuse University. Warner wanted the conference, which already included the University of Virginia, to add Virginia Tech instead — and he got his way."

Warner's popularity may have helped Democrats gain seats in the Virginia House of Delegates in 2003 and again in 2005, reducing the majorities built up by Republicans in the 1990s. Warner chaired the National Governors Association in 2004-05 and led a national high school reform movement. He chaired the Southern Governors' Association and was a member of the Democratic Governors Association. In January 2005, a two-year study, the Government Performance Project, in conjunction with Governing magazine and the Pew Charitable Trust graded each state in four management categories: money, people, infrastructure and information. Virginia and Utah received the highest ratings average with both states receiving an A− rating overall, prompting Warner to dub Virginia "the best managed state in the nation." 

Kaine and Kilgore both sought to succeed Warner as governor of Virginia. (The Virginia Constitution forbids any governor from serving consecutive terms, so Warner could not have run for a second term in 2005.) On November 8, 2005, Kaine, the former mayor of Richmond, won with 52% of the vote. Kilgore, who had resigned as attorney general in February 2005 to campaign full-time and who had previously served as Virginia secretary of public safety, received 46% of the vote. Russ Potts, a Republican state senator, also ran for governor as an independent, receiving 2% of the vote. Warner had supported and campaigned for Kaine, and many national pundits considered Kaine's victory to be further evidence of Warner's political clout in Virginia. 

On November 29, 2005, Warner commuted the death sentence of Robin Lovitt to life imprisonment without the possibility of parole. Lovitt was convicted of murdering Clayton Dicks at an Arlington pool hall in 1999. After his trial in 2001, Lovitt's lawyers stated that a court clerk illegally destroyed evidence that was used against Lovitt during his trial, but that could have possibly exonerated him upon further DNA testing. Lovitt's death sentence would have been the 1,000th carried out in the United States since the Supreme Court reinstated capital punishment as permissible under the Eighth Amendment to the Constitution in 1976. In a statement, Warner said, "The actions of an agent of the commonwealth, in a manner contrary to the express direction of the law, comes at the expense of a defendant facing society's most severe and final sanction." Warner denied clemency in 11 other death penalty cases that came before him as governor.

Warner also arranged for DNA tests of evidence left from the case of Roger Keith Coleman, who was put to death by the state in 1992. Coleman was convicted in the 1981 rape and stabbing death of his 19-year-old sister-in-law, Wanda McCoy. Coleman drew national attention, even making the cover of Time, by repeatedly claiming innocence and protesting the unfairness of the death penalty. DNA results announced on January 12, 2006 confirmed Coleman's guilt.

In July 2005, his approval ratings were at 74% and in some polls reached 80%. Warner left office with a 71% approval rating in one poll.

U.S. Senate

Elections

2008 

Warner was believed to be preparing to run for the Democratic nomination for president in 2008, and had "done everything but announce his candidacy" before suddenly stating in October 2006 he would not run for president, citing family reasons. Warner declared on September 13, 2007 that he would run for the U.S. Senate seat being vacated by the retiring John Warner (no relation) in 2008. John Warner endorsed him, which was seen as a factor of his win by over 30 points.

Warner immediately gained the endorsement of most national Democrats. He held a wide lead over his Republican opponent, fellow former Virginia governor Jim Gilmore (and Warner's predecessor), for virtually the entire campaign. Warner delivered the keynote address at the 2008 Democratic National Convention.

In a Washington Post/ABC News Poll dated September 24, 2008, Warner held a 30-point lead over Gilmore.

In the November election, Warner defeated Gilmore, taking 65 percent of the vote to Gilmore's 34 percent. Warner carried all but four counties in the state—Rockingham, Augusta, Powhatan and Hanover. In many cases, he ran up huge margins in areas of the state that have traditionally voted Republican. This was the most lopsided margin for a contested Senate race in Virginia since Chuck Robb took 72 percent of the vote in 1988. As a result of Warner's victory, Virginia had two Democratic U.S. Senators for the first time since Harry Byrd, Jr. left the Democrats to become an independent (while still caucusing with the Democrats) in 1970.

2014 

In 2014, Warner faced Ed Gillespie, who had previously served as Counselor to the President under George W. Bush and chairman of the Republican National Committee. Warner's margin of victory—only 17,000 votes—was much narrower than expected.

2020 

In 2020, Warner faced college professor and U.S. Army veteran Daniel Gade. During the general election, he defeated Gade, taking 56 percent of the vote to Gade's 44 percent.

Tenure 
Upon arriving in the U.S. Senate in 2009, Warner was appointed to the Senate's Banking, Budget, and Commerce committees. Warner was later named to the Senate Intelligence Committee in 2011.

In 2009, Warner voted for the American Recovery and Reinvestment Act, the stimulus bill. As a member of the Budget Committee, he submitted an amendment designed to help the government track how the stimulus dollars were being spent.

When offered the chair of the Democratic Senatorial Campaign Committee in preparation for the 2012 election cycle, Warner declined because he wanted to keep a distance from the partisanship of the role.

In the fall of 2012, Warner was approached by supporters about possibly leaving the Senate to seek a second four-year term as Virginia's governor. After considering the prospect, Warner announced shortly after the November 2012 elections that he had chosen to remain in the Senate because he was "all in" on finding a bipartisan solution to the country's fiscal challenges.

Warner became the senior senator on January 3, 2013 when Jim Webb left the Senate and was replaced by Tim Kaine, who was lieutenant governor while Warner was governor.

Warner has been identified as a radical centrist, working to foster compromise in the Senate. Warner was ranked the 10th most bipartisan member of the U.S. Senate during the 114th United States Congress in the Bipartisan Index, created by The Lugar Center and the McCourt School of Public Policy to assess congressional bipartisanship. According to the same methodology, Senator Warner was the second most bipartisan Democrat in the 115th United States Congress.

Abortion 
Warner is pro-choice and supports Roe v. Wade; he also supports some restrictions on abortion, such as a ban on partial-birth abortion and a 24-hour waiting period.

Health care 

On a video in his senate office, Warner promised Virginians, "I would not vote for a health-care plan that doesn't let you keep health insurance you like."

He voted for the 2010 Affordable Care Act (ACA), commonly called Obamacare, helping the Senate reach the required sixty votes to prevent it from going to a filibuster. As there were exactly 60 Democratic Senators at the time, each Democrat can be said to have cast the deciding vote. He and 11 Senate freshmen discussed adding an amendment package aimed at addressing health care costs by expanding health IT and wellness prevention.

In January 2019, Warner was one of six Democratic senators to introduce the American Miners Act of 2019, a bill that would amend the Surface Mining Control and Reclamation Act of 1977 to swap funds in excess of the amounts needed to meet existing obligations under the Abandoned Mine Land fund to the 1974 Pension Plan as part of an effort to prevent its insolvency as a result of coal company bankruptcies and the 2008 financial crisis. It also increased the Black Lung Disability Trust Fund tax and ensured that miners affected by the 2018 coal company bankruptcies would not lose their health care.

In September 2019, amid discussions to prevent a government shutdown, Warner was one of six Democratic senators to sign a letter to congressional leadership advocating for the passage of legislation that would permanently fund health care and pension benefits for retired coal miners as "families in Virginia, West Virginia, Wyoming, Alabama, Colorado, North Dakota and New Mexico" would start to receive notifications of health care termination by the end of the following month.

Finance 
From the start of his Senate term, Warner attempted to replicate in Washington, D.C. the bipartisan partnerships that he used effectively during his tenure as Virginia governor. In 2010, Warner worked with a Republican colleague on the Banking Committee, Bob Corker, to write a key portion of the Dodd-Frank Act that seeks to end taxpayer bailouts of failing Wall Street financial firms by requiring "advance funeral plans" for large financial firms.

In 2013, the Center for the Study of the Presidency and Congress gave Warner and Corker its Publius Award for their bipartisan work on financial reform legislation.

In 2018, Warner became one of the few Democrats in the Senate supporting a bill that would relax "key banking regulations". As part of at least 11 other Democrats, Warner argued that the bill would "right-size post-crisis rules imposed on small and regional lenders and help make it easier for them to provide credit". Chuck Schumer and Elizabeth Warren have stated their opposition to the legislation.

Campaign finance 
In June 2019, Warner and Amy Klobuchar introduced the Preventing Adversaries Internationally from Disbursing Advertising Dollars (PAID AD) Act, a bill that would modify U.S. federal campaign finance laws to outlaw the purchasing of ads that name a political candidate and appear on platforms by foreign nationals in the midst of an election year.

Foreign affairs and national security

Saudi Arabia and Yemen 

Warner was the original Democratic sponsor of the Startup Act legislation and has partnered with the bill's original author, Jerry Moran, to introduce three iterations of the bill: Startup Act in 2011, Startup Act 2.0 in 2012 and Startup Act 3.0 in early 2013. Warner has called the legislation the "logical next step" after enactment of the JOBS Act.

In 2015, Warner criticized the Saudi Arabian-led intervention in Yemen, saying: "I'm concerned in particular with some of the indiscriminate bombing in Yemen ... [Gulf states] need to step up and they need to step up with more focus than the kind of indiscriminate bombing."

In June 2017, Warner voted to support Trump's $350 billion arms deal with Saudi Arabia.

Israel and Palestine 

In September 2016, in advance of UN Security Council resolution 2334 condemning Israeli settlements in the occupied Palestinian territories, Warner signed an AIPAC-sponsored letter urging President Obama to veto "one-sided" resolutions against Israel.

In December 2017, Warner criticized Donald Trump's decision to recognize Jerusalem as the capital of Israel, saying that it "comes at the wrong time and unnecessarily inflames the region."

Sanctions: Iran, Russia, and North Korea 

In July 2017, Warner voted for the Countering America's Adversaries Through Sanctions Act, which grouped together sanctions against Iran, Russia and North Korea.

Central America 

In April 2019, Warner was one of 34 senators to sign a letter to Trump encouraging him "to listen to members of your own Administration and reverse a decision that will damage our national security and aggravate conditions inside Central America", asserting that Trump had "consistently expressed a flawed understanding of U.S. foreign assistance" since becoming president and that he was "personally undermining efforts to promote U.S. national security and economic prosperity" by preventing the use of Fiscal Year 2018 national security funding. The senators argued that foreign assistance to Central American countries created less migration to the U.S., citing the funding's helping to improve conditions in those countries.

Intelligence and counter-intelligence 

In May 2018, Warner voted for Gina Haspel to be the next CIA director.

In 2016, American foreign policy scholar Stefan Halper served as an FBI operative and contacted members of Trump's 2016 presidential campaign. In May 2018, Warner, the top Democrat on the Senate Intelligence Committee, warned Republican lawmakers that it would be "potentially illegal" to reveal Halper's identity.

Warner welcomed the arrest of WikiLeaks founder Julian Assange, who exposed American war crimes in Iraq and Afghanistan, saying that Assange is "a dedicated accomplice in efforts to undermine American security."

On May 13, 2020, Warner and Joe Manchin were the two Democratic senators to vote against the Lee-Leahy FISA amendment, which strengthened oversight of counterintelligence.

Telecommunications and infrastructure security 

In December 2018, Warner called Chinese telecommunications giant Huawei a threat to U.S. national security.

In February 2019, Warner was one of 11 senators to sign a letter to Energy Secretary Rick Perry and Homeland Security Secretary Kirstjen Nielsen urging them "to work with all federal, state and local regulators, as well as the hundreds of independent power producers and electricity distributors nation-wide to ensure our systems are protected" and affirming that they were "ready and willing to provide any assistance you need to secure our critical electricity infrastructure."

In July 2019, Warner was a cosponsor of the Defending America's 5G Future Act, a bill that would prevent Huawei from being removed from the Commerce Department's "entity list" without an act of Congress and authorize Congress to block administration waivers for U.S. companies to do business with Huawei. The bill would also codify Trump's executive order from the previous May that empowered his administration to block foreign tech companies deemed a national security threat from conducting business in the U.S.

Defense 

In 2011, Warner voted for the four-year extension of the USA PATRIOT Act. Also in 2011, he engaged Northern Virginia's high-tech community in a pro bono effort to correct burial mistakes and other U.S. Army management deficiencies at Arlington National Cemetery. In 2012, he successfully pushed the Navy to improve the substandard military housing in Hampton Roads.

Also in 2012, Warner pushed the Office of Personnel Management to address chronic backlogs in processing retirement benefits for federal workers, many of whom live in Washington's northern Virginia suburbs. He succeeded in pushing the Department of Veterans Affairs to expand access to PTSD treatment for female military veterans returning from service in Iraq and Afghanistan.

In August 2013, Warner was one of 23 Democratic senators to sign a letter to the Defense Department warning that some payday lenders offer "predatory loan products to service members at exorbitant triple digit effective interest rates and loan products that do not include the additional protections envisioned by the law" and asserting that service members and their families "deserve the strongest possible protections and swift action to ensure that all forms of credit offered to members of our armed forces are safe and sound."

U.S. Secretary of the Navy Ray Mabus awarded Warner the Distinguished Public Service Medal, the Navy's highest honor for a civilian, for his consistent support of Virginia's military families and veterans.

Economy 
Between 2010 and 2013, Warner invested considerable time and effort in leading the Senate's Gang of Six, along with Saxby Chambliss. Chambliss and Warner sought to craft a bipartisan plan along the lines of the Simpson-Bowles Commission to address U.S. deficits and debt.

Although the Gang of Six ultimately failed to produce a legislative "grand bargain", they did agree on the broad outlines of a plan that included spending cuts, tax reforms that produced more revenue, and reforms to entitlement programs like Medicare and Social Security—entitlement reforms that are opposed by most Democrats. Although President Obama showed interest in the plan, leaders in Congress from both parties kept a deal from being made. In 2011, the bipartisan Concord Coalition awarded Warner and Chambliss its Economic Patriots Award for their work with the Gang of Six.

Gun laws 
On April 17, 2013, Warner voted to expand background checks for gun purchases as part of the Manchin-Toomey Amendment. He also voted against the 2013 Assault Weapons Ban, but changed his position in a 2018 op-ed and has co-sponsored similar efforts since then.

In 2017, Warner called himself a strong supporter of Second Amendment rights and vowed to advocate for responsible gun ownership for hunting, recreation, and self-defense.

In January 2019, Warner was one of 40 senators to introduce the Background Check Expansion Act, a bill that would require background checks for either the sale or transfer of all firearms including all unlicensed sellers. Exceptions to the bill's background check requirement included transfers between members of law enforcement, loans for hunting or sporting events on a temporary basis, gifts to members of one's immediate family, transfers as part of an inheritance, and giving a firearm to another person temporarily for immediate self-defense.

LGBT issues 
Warner supports same-sex marriage, announcing his support in a statement on his Facebook page in March 2013. His announcement came shortly after Senator Claire McCaskill announced her support for it. In July 2015, Warner and Tim Kaine cosponsored the Equality Act along with 38 other senators and 158 members of the House of Representatives, with Kaine saying, "it's critical that we prohibit discrimination in housing, education and the workplace."

Transparency 
On the Senate Budget Committee, Warner was appointed chair of a bipartisan task force on government performance in 2009. He was a lead sponsor of the 2010 Government Performance and Results Act (GPRA), which imposed specific program performance goals across all federal agencies and set up a more transparent agency performance review process.

On May 21, 2013, Warner introduced the Digital Accountability and Transparency Act of 2014 (DATA). "The legislation requires standardized reporting of federal spending to be posted to a single website, allowing citizens to track spending in their communities and agencies to more easily identify improper payments, waste and fraud." On November 6, 2013, the Senate Homeland Security and Government Affairs committee unanimously passed DATA.

On January 27, 2014, the White House Office of Management and Budget's (OMB) marked-up version of the bill was leaked. This version "move[s] away from standards and toward open data structures to publish information" and "requir[es] OMB in consultation with Treasury to review and, if necessary, revise standards to ensure accuracy and consistency through methods such as establishing linkages between data in agency financial systems". Warner responded: "The Obama administration talks a lot about transparency, but these comments reflect a clear attempt to gut the DATA Act. DATA reflects years of bipartisan, bicameral work, and to propose substantial, unproductive changes this late in the game is unacceptable. We look forward to passing the DATA Act, which had near universal support in its House passage and passed unanimously out of its Senate committee. I will not back down from a bill that holds the government accountable and provides taxpayers the transparency they deserve."

On April 10, 2014, the Senate voted by unanimous consent to pass the bill, which was then passed by the House in a voice vote on April 28, 2014.

Minimum wage 
In April 2014, the Senate debated the Minimum Wage Fairness Act (S. 1737; 113th Congress). The bill would amend the Fair Labor Standards Act of 1938 (FLSA) to increase the federal minimum wage for employees to $10.10 per hour over two years. The bill was strongly supported by President Obama and many Democratic senators, but strongly opposed by congressional Republicans. Warner expressed a willingness to negotiate with Republicans about some of the provisions of the bill, such as the timeline for the phase-in. He said that any increase needs to be done "in a responsible way."

Controversies 
In October 2014, Warner was implicated in a federal investigation of the 2014 resignation of Virginia State Senator Phillip Puckett, a Democrat. He was alleged to have "discussed the possibility of several jobs, including a federal judgeship, for the senator's daughter in an effort to dissuade him from quitting the evenly divided state Senate." A Warner spokesman acknowledged that the conversation occurred, but said Warner made no "explicit" job offer and that he and Puckett were simply "brainstorming".

In January 2015, the Republican Party of Virginia filed a formal complaint against Warner with the United States Senate Select Committee on Ethics, alleging that Warner's interactions with Puckett violated the Honest Leadership and Open Government Act.

Campaign contributions
From 2008 to 2014, some of Warner's top ten campaign contributors were JP Morgan Chase, the Blackstone Group and Columbia Capital. BlackRock had never contributed until Warner bought shares in the BlackRock Equity Dividend Fund in 2011.

Committee assignments
 Committee on Banking, Housing, and Urban Affairs
 Subcommittee on Financial Institutions and Consumer Protection
 Subcommittee on Security and International Trade and Finance (Chair)
 Subcommittee on Securities, Insurance, and Investment (Ranking Member)
 Committee on the Budget
 Committee on Finance
 Subcommittee on Energy, Natural Resources, and Infrastructure
 Subcommittee on International Trade, Customs, and Global Competitiveness
 Subcommittee on Health Care
 Committee on Rules and Administration
 Select Committee on Intelligence (Chair)
 Joint Committee on the Library

Electoral history

Personal life
Warner is married to Lisa Collis. While on their honeymoon in 1989 in Egypt and Greece, Warner became ill; when he returned home, doctors discovered he had suffered a near-fatal burst appendix. Warner spent two months in the hospital recovering from the illness. During her husband's tenure as governor, Collis was the first Virginia first lady to use her birth name. Warner and Collis have three daughters.

Warner is involved in farming and winemaking at his Rappahannock Bend farm. There, he grows  of grapes for Ingleside Vineyards; Ingleside bottles a private label that Warner offers at charity auctions.

Warner has an estimated net worth of $257 million as of 2014.

He is not related to John Warner, his predecessor in the Senate.

Honorary degrees
Mark Warner has been awarded several honorary degrees, these include:

Honorary degrees

See also
List of celebrities who own wineries and vineyards

References

Further reading
Archival records
 Archived website of the Office of the Virginia Governor
 Archived website of Virginia Governor Mark R. Warner, 2005-2006 part of Virginia's Political Landscape 2005 Web Archive Collection at Virginia Memory
 A Guide to the Governor Mark R. Warner, Executive Office, Records, 2001-2006 at The Library of Virginia
 A Guide to the Records of the Policy Office of Governor Mark R. Warner, 2002-2006 at The Library of Virginia
 A Guide to the Governor Mark R. Warner, Press Office records, 2001-2006 (bulk 2002-2006) at The Library of Virginia
 A Guide to the Governor Mark R. Warner, Transition Office, Records, 2001 at The Library of Virginia
 A Guide to the Governor Mark R. Warner, Virginia Liaison Office, Records, 2002-2005 at The Library of Virginia

External links

 Senator Mark Warner official U.S. Senate website
 Mark Warner for Virginia campaign website
 
 

|-

|-

|-

|-

|-

|-

|-

|-

|-

|-

|-

|-

 
1954 births
Living people
20th-century American businesspeople
20th-century American politicians
21st-century American politicians
American Presbyterians
American technology company founders
American venture capitalists
Businesspeople from Connecticut
Businesspeople from Illinois
Businesspeople from Virginia
Columbian College of Arts and Sciences alumni
Democratic Party United States senators from Virginia
Democratic Party of Virginia chairs
Democratic Party governors of Virginia
Governors of Virginia
Harvard Law School alumni
People from Vernon, Connecticut
Politicians from Alexandria, Virginia
Politicians from Indianapolis
State cabinet secretaries of Virginia
United States congressional aides
Virginia Democrats